Dimitrije Đurić (29 September 1838 – 19 October 1893) was a Serbian army officer, minister of defence, professor at the military academy and member of the Serbian Royal Academy of Science. He also served as 8th Dean of the Academic Board of the Military Academy in Serbia and its chief on two occasions, 1887-1889 and 1891-1893.

Biography 
As an artillery officer in training Dimitrije Đurić spent the period 1865-67 in Russia at Tsar Nicholas I General Staff Academy. The goal of the Commune, was "the establishment of fraternal relations among all Serbs in Russia", with a view to “cooperation for the general progress of the Serbian people and nation”.

Personal life 
Dimitrije Đurić was married to Persida Matić, daughter of Minister of Education Dimitri Matić. They had three sons: Captain of artillery Milan Đurić (died at the battle of Vranje in 1911), Miloš Đurić and Velizar Đurić, and four daughters: Stanislava married to Colonel Dr Roman Sondermajer (children: Vladislaw Sondermajer, Lieutenant Colonel of aviation; Tadija Sondermajer, famous pilot of the Great War and founder of Aeroput; Stanislav Sondermajer, youngest hero of the battle of Cer and daughter Jadviga); Dragica married to Vladimir Sajnović; author Spasenija Pata Markovic married to Major Djordje Ristić and Ljubica married to Lieutenant Colonel Mihailo Naumović.

Awards and decorations

Principality of Serbia 
 Order of the Cross of Takovo Grand Officer's Cross 3rd Class with Swords
 Order of the Cross of Takovo Officer's Cross 5th Class
 Order of the Cross of Takovo Grand Cross 2nd Class
 Order Sv. Sava Commander
 Silver medal for bravery
 War of Liberation and Independence 1876-1878  Commemorative Medal
 War of 1885 Commemorative Medal

Foreign 
 Order of Saint Stanislaus, 3rd Class Russia
 Order of Saint Anna 4th Class, Russia
 Order of Independence, Montenegro

Works 
 Strategy (Tactics of War) Publisher: Ministry of Military Kingdom of Serbia 1895

References 

Serbian General Staff
Military personnel from Belgrade
1893 deaths
1838 births
Government ministers of Serbia
Recipients of the Order of the Cross of Takovo
Recipients of the Order of St. Sava
People from the Principality of Serbia
People of the Serbo-Bulgarian War
Recipients of the Medal for Bravery (Serbia)
Recipients of the Order of Saint Stanislaus (Russian), 1st class
Royal Serbian Army soldiers
Defence ministers of Serbia
Military writers